First Flight Out is an album by saxophonist Charles McPherson which was recorded in 1994 and released on the Arabesque label.

Track listing
All compositions by Charles McPherson except where noted
 "Lynns Grins" – 4:08
 "Lizabeth" – 5:51
 "Blues for Chuck" – 6:59
 "Nostalgia in Times Square" (Charles Mingus) – 7:46
 "Well, You Needn't" (Thelonious Monk) – 5:27
 "7th Dimension" – 6:19
 "Goodbye Pork Pie Hat" (Mingus) – 7:20
 "Deep Night" (Charles Henderson, Rudy Vallée) – 6:04
 "Portrait" (Mingus) – 5:08
 "Karen" – 4:18
 "My Funny Valentine" (Richard Rodgers, Lorenz Hart) – 5:40
 "First Flight Out" – 3:51

Personnel
Charles McPherson – alto saxophone
Tom Harrell – trumpet, flugelhorn
Michael Weiss – piano
Peter Washington – double bass
Victor Lewis – drums

References

Arabesque Records albums
Charles McPherson (musician) albums
1994 albums